The 1904–05 St Helens R.F.C. season was the club's tenth in the Northern Rugby Football Union, the 31st in the club's sporting history. A year after gaining promotion back to the first division, ST Helens once again struggled, and finished second-bottom to suffer another relegation. St Helens also competed in the end-of-season South West Lancashire mini-league, but could only finish fourth out of six. In the Challenge Cup, St Helens were beaten in the second round by Broughton Red Rose.

NRFU Division 2

References

St Helens R.F.C. seasons
1904 in English rugby league
1905 in English rugby league